The Kreuz Hilden (German: Autobahnkreuz Hilden) is a cloverleaf interchange in the German state North Rhine Westphalia.

The motorway interchange forms the connection between the A3 Dutch border northwest of Emmerich am Rhein-Austrian south of Passau and the A46 Heinsberg-Kreuz Wuppertal-Nord.

Geography 
The motorway interchange lays within the city limits of Hilden, after which it is named. Nearby cities are Düsseldorf, Erkrath, Haan and Solingen. When you follow the A 3 form here further north you will pass the Neanderthal valley.

History 
In this region the A3 exists since 1936, when it was built due to the building of Reichsautobahn from Colonge to Düsseldorf. Back then the Hildener Kreuz was built as a normal motorway exit as a connection to the Landstraße Unterbach–Hilden. The A 46 was built here in 1972 as B 326 also known as (Wupperschnellweg).

Reconstruction 2010 
Between April and September 2010 they widened the connection towards Düsseldorf to two lanes to make the traffic flow better. the acceleration lanes we also lengthened to let the heavy traffic blend in better on the A 3. The A3 between the motorway interchange and the motorway exit Mettmann was also given a new roadsurface.

Building form and road layout  
The motorway interchange "Kreuz Hilden" is built on a cloverleaf interchange. Near the interchange the A 3 as well as the A 46 are built in a 2x3 layout. Originally all the connections were built with one lane. During the resurfacing of the A3, due to the heavy traffic, the connection towards Düsseldorf was widened to two lanes.

Specials 
On the A 46 the Kreuz and the exit towards Landesstraße 403 (Exit Hilden) are double exits.

Traffiic near the interchange 
Approximately 230,000 vehicles use the interchange on a daily basis. This makes it to one of the busiest motorway interchanges in North Rhine-Westphalia.

External links 

Hilden